The 428th Field Artillery Brigade is a training unit under the United States Field Artillery School, a formation under TRADOC. The brigade trains all officers and enlisted personnel from the U.S. Army and U.S. Marine Corps as well as allied nation military personnel in field artillery core competencies in order to provide proficient integrators of lethal and non-lethal fires to the operational force.

History
The unit was constituted 19 July 1944 in the Army of the United States as Headquarters and Headquarters Battery, 428th Field Artillery Group. It was later activated 25 August 1944 at Fort Leonard Wood, Missouri. It was inactivated for a period on 30 September 1945 in Italy. It was later allotted 29 October 1946 to the Organized Reserves. The unit was inactivated again on 4 December 1950 at Gary, Indiana. The unit went through several more re-designations and inactivations before finally being transferred 18 August 2006 to the United States Army Training and Doctrine Command and activated 7 December 2006 at Fort Sill, Oklahoma.

Lineage & Honors

Lineage
Constituted 19 July 1944 in the Army of the United States as Headquarters and Headquarters Battery, 428th Field Artillery Group
Activated 25 August 1944 at Fort Leonard Wood, Missouri
Inactivated 30 September 1945 in Italy
Allotted 29 October 1946 to the Organized Reserves
Activated 14 November 1946 at Lafayette, Indiana
(Organized Reserves redesignated 25 March 1948 as the Organized Reserve Corps; redesignated 9 July 1952 as the Army Reserve)
Location changed 22 August 1949 to Gary, Indiana
Inactivated 4 December 1950 at Gary, Indiana
Redesignated 24 November 1967 as Headquarters and Headquarters Battery, 428th Artillery Group
Activated 31 January 1968 at South Bend, Indiana
Redesignated 1 September 1971 as Headquarters and Headquarters Battery, 428th Field Artillery Group
Redesignated 1 June 1978 as Headquarters and Headquarters Battery, 428th Field Artillery Brigade
Inactivated 15 September 1996 at South Bend, Indiana
Transferred 18 August 2006 to the United States Army Training and Doctrine Command
Headquarters activated 7 December 2006 at Fort Sill, Oklahoma

Campaign Participation Credit
World War II: Rome-Arno; North Apennines; Po Valley

Organization
The 428th Field Artillery Brigade consists of three battalions:
  2nd Battalion, 2nd Field Artillery Regiment (2-2nd FAR) (Direct Support Field Artillery Battalion)
  1st Battalion, 30th Field Artillery Regiment (1-30th FAR) (BOLC B, Captains Career Course)
  1st Battalion, 78th Field Artillery Regiment (1-78th FAR) (advanced individual training)

References

Training brigades of the United States Army
Field artillery brigades of the United States Army